Refuge du Mont Jovet is a mountain hut ('refuge') in the Savoie region of the French Alps, opened in 1890 and now maintained by the Bozel municipality. It is located a three-hour walk from La Cour, or a 45-minute drive from Bozel.

It is open from June through September each year and has bedrooms for 2-4 people each plus a dormitory for 10, showers and a restaurant. During the winter, when the main refuge is closed, a simpler refuge built in 2016 is available, 80m down the slope.

See also
List of mountain huts in the Alps

References

Mountain huts in the Alps
Mountain huts in France